Max Wilhelm Carl Vogrich (24 January 185210 June 1916) was an Austrian pianist and composer. His most popular pieces are the Passpied, Staccato Caprice, and Valse Brilliante.

Life
Max Vogrich was born in Hermannstadt, Transylvania (now Sibiu, Romania) on 24 January 1852. A childhood prodigy, he was an acclaimed pianist at the age of 14 years. He studied at Leipzig under Carl Reinecke, Hans Richter, Moritz Hauptmann, Wenzel, and Ignaz Moscheles, completing the studies in 1869. From 1870 to 1878 he was engaged in concert tours throughout continental Europe, South America, and the United States. From 1882 to 1886 he was engaged in concert tours and teaching in Australia, after which he went to New York City, where he lived for some time.  He died at Post Graduate Hospital there on 10 June 1916.

His works include the operas Vanda (1875), Lanzelot (1890), King Arthur (1893), and Buddha (1904); an oratorio, The Captivity (1891); the cantatas The Young King and the Sheperdess and The Diver; several masses, symphonies, violin and pianoforte concertos, and sonatas, besides duets, songs, and chamber music.

References

External links
 

Austrian classical pianists
Male classical pianists
Austrian classical composers
1852 births
1916 deaths
Austrian opera composers
Male opera composers
Pupils of Ignaz Moscheles
Pupils of Moritz Hauptmann
Pupils of Carl Reinecke
Austrian male classical composers
19th-century classical pianists
19th-century male musicians